Jamel Michael Ashley (born April 17, 1979) is an American athlete, competing in the sprint events.

He attended West Laurens High School in Dexter, Georgia, and later Mississippi State University.

References

External links
 

1979 births
Living people
American male sprinters
Mississippi State Bulldogs men's track and field athletes
People from Dublin, Georgia